The Trollenberg Terror (released in the U.S. as The Crawling Eye) is a 1958 British science fiction drama film, produced by Robert S. Baker and Monty Berman and directed by Quentin Lawrence. The film stars Forrest Tucker, Laurence Payne, Jennifer Jayne, and Janet Munro. The special effects are by Les Bowie. The story is based on a 1956 British ITV "Saturday Serial" television programme written by George F. Kerr, Jack Cross and Giles Cooper under the collective pseudonym of "Peter Key". The film was distributed in the UK by Eros Films Ltd. in October 1958 as The Trollenberg Terror. The film was released in the U.S. by Distributors Corporation of America as The Crawling Eye on 7 July 1958. It played on a double bill with the British science fiction film The Strange World of Planet X, renamed Cosmic Monsters for American audiences.

The Trollenberg Terrors storyline concerns United Nations troubleshooter Alan Brooks, later joined by journalist Philip Truscott, investigating unusual accidents occurring in the area of a resort hotel on the fictional Mount Trollenberg in Switzerland. Brooks suspects that these deaths are related to a series of similar incidents which occurred three years earlier in the Andes Mountains, which involved an unexplained radioactive mist and an odd cloud formation believed by locals to be inhabited.

Plot
On the Swiss mountain Trollenberg, one of three student climbers is suddenly killed, his head ripped from his body. Two sisters, Anne and Sarah Pilgrim, a London mind-reading act, are travelling by train to Geneva when Anne faints as the train passes the mountain. Upon waking, Anne insists that they must get off at the next stop.

UN troubleshooter Alan Brooks, in the same train compartment as the sisters, is going to Trollenberg's observatory to meet with Professor Crevett. Crevett goes on to explain that, despite many climbing accidents, no bodies are ever found, and an always-stationary radioactive cloud is regularly observed on the mountain's south face. Brooks mentions similar incidents that took place in the Andes three years earlier, just before a similar radioactive cloud vanished without a trace. Local rumors circulated that something was living in the heavy mist.

Anne is giving a mind-reading demonstration at the nearby hotel when she "sees" two men in a base camp hut on the mountain. Dewhurst is asleep when the other man, Brett, under some kind of mental compulsion, walks outside as the cloud envelopes the hut. Anne suddenly faints again. Brooks phones the hut—-Dewhurst answers, screams and then the connection suddenly goes dead.

A rescue party, including Brooks, climbs up to the camp hut looking for both men. Anne, in a trance-like state, urges the rescuers to stay away. Inside the hut, the rescuers discover that everything is frozen solid, despite the door being locked from the inside. Dewhurst's body is found under a bed, its head missing. A spotter plane arrives and circles overhead, and a man is spotted a half mile away. The first rescuer finds a rucksack at that location with a severed head inside. He is set upon and killed by Brett, who also kills the second rescuer when he arrives.

Later at the hotel, Brett suddenly staggers in, claiming that he had been lost on the mountain. Soon after, he attacks Anne with a knife, but Brooks manages to subdue him. Brett sustains a severe head gash during the struggle, but no blood flows from the wound. He is heavily sedated and locked away. Brooks recalls to journalist Philip Truscott a similar incident in the Andes that followed a similar pattern: a man murdered an elderly woman who allegedly had psychic abilities like those displayed by Anne. The killer's body was discovered to have been dead for at least 24 hours prior to his murder of the old woman. Brett escapes his improvised cell and resumes his hunt for Anne, this time armed with a handaxe. Before he can reach her, Brooks dispatches him with a pistol. Brett's flesh appears crystalized upon inspection and rapidly decomposes in the heat.

The cloud has begun to move down the mountainside towards the hotel, so the guests retreat up to the fortified observatory. A mother realises that her young daughter is missing as they enter the cable car. In a thickening mist, a giant tentacled creature with a single huge eye appears at the hotel, smashing down the front door. Brooks manages to rescue the child from the lobby, both of them narrowly escaping. They return to the cable car, but the delay gives the mist a chance to reach the car platform. The transport motor begins to freeze, starting and stopping, the cable slipping, but the cable car arrives safely. The single cloud has now split into five while converging on the observatory.

Hans, who left the hotel by car, suddenly turns up at the observatory. Once inside, he begins exhibiting the same obsession with Anne. Hans tries to strangle her, but Brooks and Truscott stop him as Brooks stabs him. As the monsters near the observatory, everyone makes Molotov cocktails to combat them. By radio, Alan orders an aerial firebombing raid against the observatory, which has a reinforced concrete roof and walls that can withstand the assault.

Truscott strikes one of the creatures with a Molotov cocktail, setting it ablaze. He is caught by a tentacle from another monster now atop the observatory's roof. Brooks sets that one ablaze with another Molotov cocktail, forcing it to drop Truscott. Later, Truscott firebombs another creature that manages to breach a portion of thick wall to get at Anne. The aerial firebombing assault begins and successfully torches the remaining monsters.

Cast
 Forrest Tucker as Alan Brooks
 Laurence Payne as Philip Truscott
 Jennifer Jayne as Sarah Pilgrim
 Janet Munro as Anne Pilgrim
 Warren Mitchell as Professor Crevett
 Frederick Schiller as Mayor Klein
 Andrew Faulds as Brett
 Stuart Saunders as Dewhurst
 Colin Douglas as Hans
 Derek Sydney as Wilde
 Richard Golding as first villager
 George Herbert as second villager
 Anne Sharp as German woman
 Leslie Heritage as Carl
 Jeremy Longhurst as first student climber
 Anthony Parker as second student climber
 Theodore Wilhelm as Fritz
 Garard Green as pilot
 Caroline Claser as little girl

Production
The Trollenberg Terror was the final film produced by Southall Studios, one of the earliest pioneer film studios in the U.K., and was one of the last films released by Distributors Corporation of America.

Mitchell's role was originally meant to be played by Anton Diffring, but Diffring pulled out of the part at the last minute.

Reception
In the January 1, 1959 issue of The New York Times, film critic Richard W. Nason reviewed the double feature starring Forrest Tucker and opined that "...The Crawling Eye and The Cosmic Monsters do nothing to enhance or advance the copious genre of science fiction".
 
Film historian and critic Leonard Maltin considered The Trollenberg Terror as "ok, if predictable", a feature that showed its humble origins, being adapted by Jimmy Sangster from the British TV series (also called The Trollenberg Terror) about cloud-hiding alien invaders on a Swiss mountaintop. Maltin noted that the film was "hampered by low-grade special effects".

The Trollenberg Terror was one of the inspirations for writer/director John Carpenter's 1980 horror film The Fog.

In popular culture
The main title music from The Crawling Eye was featured on the album Greatest Science Fiction Hits V by Neil Norman and his Cosmic Orchestra, released in 1979 on GNP Crescendo Records.

The film is mentioned in Stephen King's 1986 horror novel It as having been watched by one of the book's protagonists (Richie Tozier) and that the movie terrified him; a crawling eye creature later appears as a manifestation of It, the novel's title monster.

Under the title The Crawling Eye, the film was the first of many productions to be mocked on the TV series Mystery Science Theater 3000, after the series moved from KTMA to Comedy Central; the episode aired on 11 November 1989. It was also briefly mentioned at the end of the season 10 finale (the original series finale) covering Danger: Diabolik. It aired in 2021 with several humorous interludes in a special "Saturday Pandemic " episode of svengoolie.

The Freakazoid episode "The Cloud" spoofed the opening credits of the film and key elements of the plot, though with the victims being turned into clowns instead of being killed.

A song called "Crawling Eye" was featured on American horror punk band the Misfits' 1999 album Famous Monsters; the song's lyrics directly referenced the plot of the film.

Shown on the MeTV show Svengoolie on November 26, 2022.

References

Bibliography

 Blush, Steven. American Hardcore: A Tribal History. New York: Feral House, 2001. .
 Hamilton, John. The British Independent Horror Film 1951–70. Hailsham, U.K.: Hemlock Books, 2013. .
 King, Stephen. It. New York: Viking, 1986. .
 Lenburg, Jeff. "Steven Spielberg Presents Freakazoid!". The Encyclopedia of Animated Cartoons (third edition). New York, New York: Checkmark Books, 1999. .
 Maltin, Leonard. Leonard Maltin's Movie Guide 2009. New York: New American Library, 2009 (originally published as TV Movies, then as Leonard Maltin's Movie & Video Guide), first edition 1969, published annually since 1988. .
 Warren, Bill. Keep Watching the Skies: American Science Fiction Films of the Fifties: 21st Century Edition. Jefferson, North Carolina: McFarland & Company, 2009 (first edition: Volume 1 (1982), Volume 2 (1986)). .

External links

 
 
 
 Southall Film Studios
 Action TV
 Mystery Science Theater 3000
 
 Episode Guide: 101- The Crawling Eye

1958 films
1958 horror films
1950s monster movies
Giant monster films
British monster movies
1950s science fiction horror films
British science fiction films
British horror films
Films shot at Southall Studios
Films directed by Quentin Lawrence
Films set in Switzerland
Films set in the Alps
Alien invasions in films
Films with screenplays by Jimmy Sangster
1950s English-language films
1950s British films